During the colonial period in Ghana (at the time known as the Gold Coast) roughly corresponding to the 15th through 19th centuries, European-style coastal forts and castles were built, mostly by the Portuguese, Dutch and British. These forts linked the trading routes established by the Portuguese and acted as important market places for the gold and slave trades. Because of their testimony to precolonial and colonial Afro-European commerce (including the Atlantic slave trade) and their profound effect on the history of West Africa, a number of these fortifications and outposts were designated as a World Heritage Site by UNESCO in 1979.

Kumasi Fort in the Ashanti Region was originally built by an Asante king in imitation of these colonial forts.

Coastal regions

World Heritage listed forts

Forts and Castles, Volta, Greater Accra, Central and Western Regions is the collective designation by UNESCO of European-style fortifications and outposts (mostly Portuguese, Dutch and British) along the Gold Coast (modern-day Ghana) during the colonial period. The term specifically applies to a number of such fortifications designated as a World Heritage Site by UNESCO in 1979, including:

 Three castles:
 Cape Coast at Cape Coast
 St. George's d’Elmina at Elmina
 Christiansborg at Osu, Accra
 Fifteen forts:
Good Hope at Senya Beraku
 Patience at Apam
 Amsterdam at Abandze
 St. Jago at Elmina
 San Sebastian at Shama
 Metal Cross at Dixcove
 St. Anthony at Axim
 Orange at Sekondi
  at Prince's Town
 William (Lighthouse) at Cape Coast
 William at Anomabu
Victoria at Cape Coast
 Ussher at Usshertown, Accra
 James at Jamestown, Accra
 Apollonia at Beyin
 Four forts partially in ruins:
 Amsterdam at Abandze (Note, this fort is listed both as fort and as fort partially in ruins by UNESCO)
 English Fort at British Komenda
 Batenstein at Butre; 
 Prinzensten at Keta
 Ruins with visible structures:
 Nassau at Mouri
 Fredensborg at Old Ningo
 Vredenburg at Dutch Komenda
 Vernon at Prampram
 Dorothea at Akwidaa
 Two sites with traces of former fortifications:
 Frederiksborg at Amanful, Cape Coast
 Fort Augustaborg at Teshie

Other coastal forts
Other coastal forts included in Ghana's material cultural heritage list of the Ghana Museums and Monuments Board:
 Fort Fredericksburg at Amanful (distinguished from Fort Frederiksborg/Fort Royal near Cape Coast Castle)
 Fort McCarthy at Cape Coast
 The Little Fort at Anomabu
 Fort Tantumquery at Otuam

Not listed as heritage (mostly largely destroyed or otherwise lost):
 Fort Winneba at Winneba
 Fort Sekondi at Sekondi
 Fort Kongenstein at Ada
 Fort Elize Carthago near Axim
 Fort Ruychaver on the banks of the Ankobra River
 Fort Witsen near Sekondi

By region (from East to West):
Volta Region:
 Fort Prinzenstein, Keta
Greater Accra Region:
 Fort Fredensborg, Old Ningo
 Fort Vernon, Prampram
 Fort Augustaborg, Teshie
 Osu Castle (Christiansborg), Accra
 Ussher Fort, Accra
 Fort James, Accra
Central Region:
 Fort Good Hope (Fort Goede Hoop), Senya Beraku
 Fort Lijdzaamheid ('Patience'), Apam
 Fort Amsterdam, Abandze
 Fort William, Anomabu
 Fort Nassau, Moree
 Cape Coast Castle, Cape Coast
 Fort William (Lighthouse), Cape Coast
 Fort Victoria, Cape Coast
 Elmina Castle, Elmina
 Fort Coenraadsburg, Elmina
 Fort Vredenburgh, Komenda
 English Fort, Komenda
Western Region:
 Fort San Sebastian, Shama
 Fort Orange, Sekondi
 Fort Batenstein, Butri
 Fort Metal Cross, Dixcove
 , Prince's Town
 Fort Santo Antonio, Axim
 Fort Apollonia, Beyin

Other regions
 Kumasi Fort in the Ashanti Region.

References

External links 
 Ghana-Net: Forts and Castles of Ghana (with pictures)
 Ghana Place Names: Forts & Castles (meanings and origins of names)

Castles
 
Castles
Ghana
Castles
Ghana
Castles